Utgaardostylus is an extinct Permian bryozoan genus of the family Dyscritellidae. It was discovered in northeastern Nevada.

References

Prehistoric bryozoan genera